Vincent Magbanua is a Filipino actor appearing in films like "Palawan Fate" and "Balut Country". He also appears in the TV show "Super Ma'am". [1]

He was born on April 7, 2000. He is also a member of GMA Artist Center. His other projects include "Nino", "Prinsesa ng Buhay Ko", "Indio", "Kakambal ni Eliana", and "Magkano Ba Ang Pag-Ibig?". [2]

Vincent Magbanua is one of the cast of the TV show Juan Happy Love Story [3] and hails from Palawan. He is part of the TV soap opera Indio where he played the young Bong Revilla. He is also part of the indie film Balut Country. [4] He also made a guest appearance in the TV show Pari Koy. [5]

Filmography

References

[2] https://www.gmanetwork.com/artistcenter/talents/318/Vincent-Magbanua

[3] http://www.lionheartv.net/tag/vincent-magbanua/

[4] http://www.philstar.com/entertainment/2015/11/28/1526592/child-haus-brings-together-top-caliber-child-performers

[5] http://tempo.com.ph/2015/03/11/jake-has-beas-tattooed-name-removed-from-his-arm/

Living people
2000 births
GMA Network personalities